Ebbw Vale Parkway railway station is a station on the Ebbw Valley Railway in Wales.  The station opened on 6 February 2008 when services to and from Cardiff Central commenced after 46 years of being a freight-only line. A northwards extension of the line to a new terminus at Ebbw Vale Town opened on 17 May 2015, which accounts for the drop in usage in 2015–16. A direct service to Newport was expected to commence in 2018 following double-tracking and re-signalling works between Aberbeeg and Crosskeys, but this has now been pushed back to 2021.

The station has been built on the site of the former Victoria station in the Victoria area of the Ebbw Vale conurbation. It consists of a single platform adjacent to Glan Ebbw Terrace, close to the A4046 Station Road.

Services
Today, the current service is one train per hour to Cardiff Central calling at Llanhilleth, Newbridge, Crosskeys, Risca, Rogerstone, Pye Corner and Cardiff Central, departing at 40 minutes past each hour. The journey times to Cardiff is approximately fifty minutes. Occasional services continue beyond Cardiff to Swansea, Bridgend or Maesteg.

Services are usually operated by Class 150 Sprinter units, although Class 142 & Class 143 Pacer units, Class 158 Express Sprinter and Class 175 Coradia units have been cleared to work the line.

Demand for travel to and from the station was seriously under-estimated by the promoters of the line's reopening, even though the service provided was to Cardiff only and not to Newport as well, as originally assumed. For example, in 2008–09, usage at the station was forecast to be 50,000, for journeys on the lines to Cardiff and to Newport, but was actually about 250,000, for journeys on the line to Cardiff only. Part of the reason for the demand underforecast was the requirement that no demand from regeneration of the former steelworks area should be assumed.

Bus interchange

The station is a thirty eight minute walk (1.8 miles) from Ebbw Vale bus station (known as Inner Bypass), which is the terminus for a number of Stagecoach South Wales services to Cardiff, Abergavenny, Brynmawr, Tredegar, and other nearby villages.

The station is closest served by the bus stop at Waunlwyd on the A4046. There are bus connections from here to nearby communities such as Cwm, the Garden Festival Shopping site, Ysbyty Aneurin Bevan and Ebbw Vale Town itself.

Peter Law plaque
A plaque at the railway station commemorates local MP and Assembly Member Peter Law, who died in 2006, in honour of his work to re-open the line.

References

External links

Details of proposals for station, with pictures
Archive of Ebbw Valley Railway Scheme website (Blaenau Gwent council, 2008)

Railway stations in Blaenau Gwent
DfT Category F1 stations
Former Great Western Railway stations
Railway stations in Great Britain opened in 1852
Railway stations in Great Britain closed in 1962
Railway stations in Great Britain opened in 2008
Railway stations served by Transport for Wales Rail
Railway stations opened by Network Rail
Transport in Ebbw Vale
1852 establishments in Wales